Nanjian Yi Autonomous County is a county in the Dali Bai Autonomous Prefecture  located in the west central part of Yunnan province, China.

Administrative divisions
Nanjian Yi Autonomous County has 5 towns and 3 townships. 
5 towns

3 townships
 Yongcui
 Leqiu
 Bixi

Ethnic groups
The Nanjian County Gazetteer (1993) lists the following ethnic groups.
Yi (Western and Central Yi languages)
Black Yi, White Yi
Luoluo 倮倮, Black Luoluo 黑倮倮, White Luoluo 白倮倮
Tuzu 土族
Xiangtang 香堂
Micha 密岔
Laluobo 腊罗拨/腊鲁拨
Enibo 额尼拨 (Central Yi)
Misabo 迷撒拨
Hui
Bai (only some can speak Bai)
Miao
White Miao 白苗 (Menglou 孟镂)
Green Miao 青苗 (Mengsa 孟撒): in Guihuaqing 桂花箐, Weibixi Township 唯碧溪乡
Chinese Miao 汉苗 (Mengzhua 孟抓)
Bulang (autonym: Pu 濮; exonyms: Puman 濮曼, Pumanzi 濮蛮子): along the Jiancang River 涧沧江 in Wangjiang 望江, Wanzi 湾子, Lelongzhai 乐龙寨, Goujie 狗街, Yanzijiao 岩子脚, Luodihe 落底河
Lisu
Han

In Nanjian County, ethnic Bulang are located in Banqiao Village 板桥村, Langcang Township 浪沧乡 (Dali Prefecture Gazetteer, Vol. 9 1998:127).

Transportation
China National Highway 214
Xiaowan East railway station

Climate

References

External links
 Nanjian County Official Website

County-level divisions of Dali Bai Autonomous Prefecture
Yi autonomous counties